This is a list of earthquakes in 1925. Only magnitude 6.0 or greater earthquakes will appear on the list. Lower magnitude events are also included if they caused death, injury or damage. Events which occurred in remote areas will be excluded from the list as they wouldn't have generated significant media interest. All dates are listed according to UTC time. It was a fairly busy year with several deadly events occurring. Most notably was an earthquake in China in March which left at least 5,000 dead. Other deadly events occurred in Iran, Japan, the Philippines and California. No earthquake exceeded a magnitude of 7.3; in the vast majority of years there have been at least one or two events much more powerful than that.

Overall

By death toll 

 Note: At least 10 casualties

By magnitude 

 Note: At least 7.0 magnitude

Notable events

January

February

March

April

May

June

July

August

September

October

November

December

References

1925
 
1925